The following is a list of chapters of the Japanese manga series O-Parts Hunter. Written and illustrated by Seishi Kishimoto, 666 Satan was originally serialized by Enix (later Square Enix) in the magazine Monthly Shōnen Gangan from 2001 to 2007. The 79 chapters were collected into 19 tankōbon volumes. It was licensed for an English release in North America by Viz Media, who released it under the title O-Parts Hunter.



Volume list

References

External links
 O-Parts Hunter at Viz Media

O-Parts Hunter